Wu Peng (born 15 August 1982) is a Chinese footballer.

Career statistics

Club

Notes

Honours

Club
Wuhan Optics Valley
China League One: 2004

Chongqing Lifan
China League One: 2014

References

1982 births
Living people
Chinese footballers
Association football midfielders
China League One players
Chinese Super League players
Wuhan F.C. players
Chongqing Liangjiang Athletic F.C. players
Nantong Zhiyun F.C. players
Xinjiang Tianshan Leopard F.C. players